This is a list of islands of the United Kingdom. The United Kingdom of Great Britain and Northern Ireland has thousands of islands within its territory and several external territories. This is a list of selected British islands grouped by constituent country or overseas territory. The largest British island is Great Britain, which forms a substantial majority of the United Kingdom and is the ninth-largest island in the world.

United Kingdom 

 Great Britain (the largest island in Europe)

England 

 Barrow Island
 Bawden Rocks
 Brownsea Island
 Canvey Island
 Coquet Island
 Drake's Island
 Eddystone
 Farne Islands
 Staple Island
 Foulness Island
 Furzey Island
 Green Island
 Havergate Island
 Hayling Island
 Hilbre Island
 Isle of Portland
 Isle of Sheppey

 Isle of Wight 
 Isles of Scilly
 Annet
 Bryher
 Gugh
 Samson
 St Agnes
 St Helen's
 St Martin's
 St Mary's
 Tresco
 Lindisfarne
 Lundy
 Seal's Rock
 Mersea Island
 Pilsey Island
 Portsea Island
 Read's Island
 Roa Island
 Seghy
 Steep Holm
The Gwineas
 Thorney Island
 Virtle Rock
 Wallasea Island
 Walney Island

Northern Ireland 
Northern Ireland is a part of the island of Ireland, see; list of islands of Ireland and list of inland islands of Ireland.

 Boa Island
 Cannon Rock
 Copeland Islands
 Lustymore Island
 Rathlin Island
 Ram's Island
 White Island

Scotland 

 Ailsa Craig
 Arran
 Bute
 Isle of Skye
 Raasay
 Rona (disambiguation)
 Soay (disambiguation)
 Muck
 Eigg
 Rùm
 Shuna
 Colonsay
 Oronsay
 Scarba
 Easdale
 Jura
 Islay
 Mull
 Ulva
 Gometra
 Iona
 Coll
 Tiree
 Lewis and Harris (the largest island in the British Isles after Great Britain and Ireland)
 Orkney
 Mainland   pig
 Shetland
 Rockall
 Hiort or Hirta
 Boreray (disambiguation)
 Stac Lee
 Vatersay
 Eriskay
 Grimsay
 Berneray
 Barra
 Mingulay
 South Uist
 Benbecula
 North Uist
 Vallay
 Killegray
 Berneray (disambiguation)
 Taransay
 Scarp
 Mealasta Island
 Scalpay, Inner Hebrides
 Scalpay, Outer Hebrides
 Great Bernera
 Little Bernera
 Pabbay Mhor
 Pabbay Bheag
 Berisay
 The Old Hill
 Flodday
 Vuia Mhor
 Vuia Bheag
 Vacasay West Loch Roag
 Vacasay East Loch Roag
 North Rona
 Sulisker
 Eilean Colm Cille
 Hoy
 North Ronaldsay
 South Ronaldsay
 Sanday
 Westray
 Rousay
 Gairsay
 Eday
 Auskerry
 Stronsay
 Shapinsay
 Burray
 Copinsay
 Foula
 Whalsay
 Yell
 Unst
 Fair Isle
 Fetlar
 Bressay
 East and West Burra
 Muckle Roe
 Papa Stour
 Trondra
 Out Skerries
 Mousa
 About 800 other islands

Wales 

 Anglesey (the largest island of Wales)
 Church Island
 Cribinau
 East Mouse
 Holy Island
 Middle Mouse
 North Stack
 Puffin Island
 Salt Island
 The Skerries
 South Stack
 West Mouse
 Bardsey Island
 Caldey Island
 Cardigan Island
 Denny Island
 Flat Holm
 Grassholm Island
 Ramsey Island
 Skokholm Island
 Skomer Island
 Sully Island

Overseas Territories

Anguilla 

 Anguilla
 Anguillita
 Dog Island
 Prickly Pear Cays
 Sandy Island, also known as Sand Island
 Scrub Island
 Seal Island
 Sombrero, also known as Hat Island

Ascension Island 
Ascension Island is a dependency of Saint Helena.

 Ascension Island
 Boatswain Bird Island
 Boatswain Bird Rock
 Tartar Rock
 White Rocks

Bermuda 

 Boaz Island
 Castle Island
 Hawkins Island
 Ireland Island
 Nonsuch Island
 Ordnance Island
 Paget Island
 Saint David's Island
 Saint George's Island
 Smith's Island
 Somerset Island
 Trunk Island

British Antarctic Territory 

Much of the British Antarctic Territory is also included in the overlapping claims of Chile and Argentina.  None of these claims have gained wide international recognition (only the British claim gained any) and are suspended. All are regulated by the Antarctic Treaty

 Adelaide Island
 Astrolabe Island
 Berkner Island
 Dundee Island
 D'Urville Island
 James Ross Island
 Lockyer Island
 Joinville Island
 Snow Hill Island
 South Orkney Islands
 Acuña Island
Coronation Island
 Inaccessible Islands
 Laurie Island
 Powell Island
 Robertson Island
 Saddle Islands
Shagnasty Island
 Signy Island
Valette Island
 South Shetland Islands
 Aitcho Islands
 Barrientos Island
 Emeline Island
 Jorge Island
 Cecilia Island, named Isla Torre by Chile
 Sierra Island
 Passage Rock
 Morris Rock
 Clarence Island
 Deception Island
 Elephant Island
 Cornwallis Island
 Gibbs Island
 Rowett Island
 Seal Islands
 Greenwich Island
 King George Island
 Bridgeman Island
 Penguin Island
 Livingston Island
 Desolation Island
 Half Moon Island
 Rugged Island
 Low Island
 Nelson Island
 Robert Island
 Smith Island
 Snow Island
 Vega Island
 ZigZag Island

British Indian Ocean Territory 

 Blenheim Reef
 Danger Island
 Diego Garcia
 Eagle Islands
 Eagle Island (Ile Aigle)
 Ile Aux Vaches
 Egmont Islands
 Eastern Egmont (Ile Sud-Est)
 Ile aux Rats
 Ile Carre Pate
 Ile Cipaye
 Ile Lubine
 Ganges Bank
 Great Chagos Bank
 Nelsons Island
 Owen Bank
 Peros Banhos
 Pitt Bank
 Salomon Islands
 Ile Anglaise
 Ile Boddam
 Ile Charles
 Ile de la Passe
 Ile Diable
 Ile Du Sel
 Ile Fouquet
 Ile Jacobin
 Ile Mapou
 Ile Poule
 Ile Sepulture
 Takamaka Islands
 Ile Takamaka
 Speakers Bank
 Victory Bank
 Wight Bank

British Virgin Islands 

 Anegada
 Horseshoe Reef
 Little Anegada
 Beef Island
 Bellamy Cay
 Whale Rock
 Dog Islands
 George Dog Island
 Great Dog Island
 Seal Dog Islands
 East Seal Dog Island
 Little Seal Dog Island
 West Dog Island
 Jost Van Dyke
 Little Jost Van Dyke
 Little Sisters
 Carvel Rock
 Cooper Island
 Ginger Island
 Norman Island
 Pelican Island
 Carrot Rock
 Dead Chest Island
 Salt Island
 Tortola
 Buck Island
 Virgin Gorda
 Eustatia Island
 Fallen Jerusalem Island
 Mosquito Island
 Necker Island
 Round Rock

Cayman Islands 

 Cayman Brac
 Grand Cayman
 Little Cayman
 Owen Island

Falkland Islands 

The Falkland Islands are also claimed by Argentina, see: Falkland Islands sovereignty dispute.

 East Falkland
 Sea Lion Island
 West Falkland
 Jason Islands
 Elephant Jason Island
 Flat Jason Island
 Grand Jason Island
 South Jason Island
 Steeple Jason Island
 Passage Islands
 Pebble Island
 East Island
 Golding Island
 Pebble Islet
 Rabbit Island
 Saunders Island
 Swan Islands
North Swan Island
Swan Island
West Swan Island
 Weddell Island

Montserrat 

 Montserrat
 Goat Islet
 Little Redonda

Pitcairn Islands 

 Ducie Island
 Acadia Islet
 Edwards Islet
 Pandora Islet
 Westward Islet
 Henderson Island
 Oeno Island
 Pitcairn Island

Saint Helena 
 Saint Helena

South Georgia and the South Sandwich Islands 
South Georgia and the South Sandwich Islands are also claimed by Argentina. See Falkland Islands sovereignty dispute.

 Black Rock
 Clerke Rocks
 Shag Rocks
 South Georgia
 Annenkov Island
 Bird Island
 Cooper Island
 Grassholm
 Grass Island
 Pickersgill Islands
 Welcome Islands
 Willis Islands
 Main Island
 Trinity Island
 South Sandwich Islands
 Candlemas Islands
 Central Islands
 Southern Thule
 Traversay Islands

Tristan da Cunha 
Tristan da Cunha is a dependency of Saint Helena.

 Gough Island (a dependency of Tristan da Cunha)
 Inaccessible Island
 Nightingale Islands
 Middle Island
 Nightingale Island
 Stoltenhoff Island
 Tristan Da Cunha

Turks and Caicos Islands 
 Turks Islands
 Grand Turk Island
 Salt Cay
 Cotton Cay
 Caicos Islands
East Caicos
Middle Caicos
North Caicos
Parrot Cay
Providenciales
South Caicos
West Caicos

See also 
The Crown dependencies are not part of the United Kingdom. For details of islands within their territories, see:

List of islands of the Bailiwick of Guernsey
List of islands of the Bailiwick of Jersey
List of islands of the Isle of Man

Lists of islands by country
Islands of the British Isles